Amanda Jean Thompson  (born September 1962) is a British businesswoman who is the CEO of Blackpool Pleasure Beach, president of Stageworks Worldwide Productions, director of Big Blue Hotel and the Boulevard Hotel, a patron of the Grand Theatre, Blackpool, and Patron of the Blackpool Civic Trust. She rose to the position of managing director in 2004 after the death of her father, Geoffrey Thompson. She was also managing director of Pleasureland Southport from 2004 until its closure in 2006.

Career highlights

Thompson went to a private school in Oxford, then worked for Disney before producing her first ice show in 1982.

Thompson was appointed managing director of Blackpool Pleasure Beach in 2004, following the death of her father and grandmother. Her brother, Nicholas Thompson became the deputy managing director.

Thompson has been a prominent individual within the attractions industries global community and has been involved with the International Association of Amusement Parks and Attractions (IAAPA) chairing the Europe, Middle East and Africa committee (EMEA) for numerous years and now on the EMEA Advisory Committee. She was nominated to the IAAPA board of directors in 2018 and led the Global Attractions industry as chairman of the board in 2020 and 2021 being the first European woman to do so, and the first chairman to ever serve for 2 years.  In 2022 Thompson holds many positions with IAAPA including the Executive Finance Committee, Selection Committee, Governance Committee, Advisory Board as well as being a main Board Director.  Thompson has been nominated within the top 10 most influential individuals in the attractions industry.

Personal life
Thompson was born in London. She was awarded an OBE in the 2012 New Year Honours.

References

External links

1962 births
Living people
People from Islington (district)
Blackpool Pleasure Beach
English businesspeople
Officers of the Order of the British Empire